Marie Sharp's Fine Foods Ltd., better known as Marie Sharp's is a plant-based condiment and jam manufacturer based in the Stann Creek District of Belize, Central America. The women-owned company is named after its founder Marie Sharp and is highly regarded for its authentic Caribbean, carrot-based habanero pepper sauce recipe.  Marie's Belizean habanero pepper (hot) sauces consistently rank among the world's tastiest and most beloved condiments.

The brand offers many varieties of sauces made from sustainably farmed, hand-picked, fresh fruit and vegetable bases such as carrots, orange/grapefruit pulp, nopales, tamarind, mango, and pineapple combined with crushed habaneros or other chiles.

Marie Sharp exports her habanero pepper sauces to more than 30 countries.

History

The company is privately owned by Marie Sharp, 81 years old in 2021, who began locally selling sauces on her 400-acre Melinda Estates farm outside Dangriga in 1981. In 1985 a factory was built to meet growing demand, now also serving as a popular tourist destination. The product was the first commercially successful agricultural product manufactured in and exported from Belize.  It was originally sold under the name of "Melinda’s Hot Sauce", a reference to the Melinda family farm, which is located within the Melinda Reserve, at #1 Melinda Road.Marie's recipe was the first habanero pepper sauce to achieve national distribution in the United States, with the Reese Finer Foods distribution network in 1989.  Once the market for the product had been established, the importer, Figueroa International Inc., who was marketing the sauce, trademarked the product name, effectively cutting Sharp out of her own business.

After a five-year struggle, Sharp gave up her original brand name, Melinda's Original Habanero Pepper sauce, in exchange for being released from her exclusive contract with the importer.  She then re-branded the product under her own name.  Distribution has since expanded from Belize to much of Central and North America, Europe, Asia and Australia.

In 2013, Sharp's entries at the Anuga Food Fair in Cologne made the prestigious "Taste13 Showcase" round and placed in the top three products at the world's largest food fair. In 2014 Marie Sharp's sales totaled $3.8 million. In 2016, the founder was inducted into the Hot Sauce Hall of Fame. The company also introduced their newest pepper sauce, "Smokin' Marie's", a smoked habanero sauce inspired by Alaskan smoked products.  A combination of orange, grapefruit, guava and craboo-wood is used to smoke the habaneros.

On January 14, 2019, Gerry Sharp, Marie's husband and business partner later in life, died.  He was a citrus pioneer in Belize and was instrumental in helping to shape the industry.

On January 27, 2019, Marie Sharp's oldest son Michael Alexander Williams, Sr., 58, was murdered. Michael managed operations in Belize City for the company since the 1990s and he was instrumental to the continuing success of the Marie Sharp's brand in the country's largest market and throughout Central America.

On February 14, 2019, in partnership with the US Embassy in Belize, Marie Sharp announced the launch of a new pineapple pepper sauce, "Pure Love",  created to aid Combating Gender-Based Violence through Partnership Portions of the proceeds of the sale of “Pure Love” will go to Haven House–a non-profit domestic violence shelter–directly benefiting victims of gender-based violence and empowering them to take control and positively transform their lives. Jody Williams, grandson to Marie Sharp, presented Haven House with its latest contribution February 2, 2022. Dr. Sharmayne Saunders, President, Haven House, said "I know right now it's a critical time in our society because we see leaders who, the black eye of domestic violence has been cast on them but domestic violence is happening. It doesn't matter what class race, it's happening and we are one of the providers of this service."

"We will only hear about domestic violence when it hits our doorsteps, other than that it really seems dormant, nobody pays attention to it until it's the who is involved in the domestic violence but the work continues, we have people who need the assistance and help and we can only do it through these types of effort as demonstrated by Marie Sharp and the U.S. Embassy."

Production 
Originally, Marie Sharp made hot sauce using hand blenders in her home in the hills of Pomona Village, where she lived with her husband Gerry Sharp, General Manager of the Citrus Company of Belize.  In 2021, Marie Sharp celebrated forty years of sauce making.

Sauce Varieties 
Marie Sharp does not use fermented peppers in her recipes, sauces are made using fresh fruits and vegetables cooked slowly for many hours, resulting in a velvety rich body with noticeable vegetable artifacts.

Jelly, jam, chutney and salsa
In 1982, finding that the farm had surplus fruit, Sharp visited local markets to get ideas of what products she and other farmers might be able to produce to increase their sales. Discovering that all the commercially produced jams, jellies and marmalades were manufactured from non-tropical fruits, she recognized an opportunity. Experimenting with recipes, Sharp developed a product with higher fruit content than the US Food and Drug Administration required and began marketing her products made without preservatives. Marie Sharp's produces many types of preserves which are marketed locally and internationally.

See also
 List of hot sauces
 Scoville heat scale

References

External links
 
 Official USA Website

Hot sauces
Brand name condiments
Condiment companies
Food and drink companies of Belize
Belizean brands
Companies established in 1981
1981 establishments in Belize